The 1900–01 Northern Rugby Football Union season was the sixth season of rugby league football.

Season summary

The Lancashire Senior Competition was won by Oldham and the Yorkshire Senior Competition by Bradford.

In 1901 Bramley's James Lomas became rugby league's first £100 transfer, moving to Salford.

Lancashire Senior Competition

Barrow replaced Tyldesley. Although participating in the Lancashire Senior Competition, Runcorn and Stockport were from Cheshire, and Millom were from Cumberland.

 St Helens had 2 points deducted for a breach of the professional rules.

Yorkshire Senior Competition

 Bradford, Hull and Holbeck each had 2 points deducted for a breach of the professional rules.

Challenge Cup

The 1901 Challenge Cup was the 5th staging of rugby league's oldest knockout competition, the Challenge Cup. The final was played between Batley and Warrington at Headingley Stadium in Leeds.

References

External links
1900-01 Rugby Football League season at wigan.rlfans.com
The Challenge Cup at The Rugby Football League website

1900 in English rugby league
1901 in English rugby league
Northern Rugby Football Union seasons